Alayah Benavidez (born August 7, 1995) is an American beauty pageant titleholder from San Antonio, Texas, who was crowned Miss United States 2016. Benavidez was also crowned Miss Texas USA 2019, and represented Texas at the Miss USA pageant. Benavidez appeared on the The Bachelor Season 24. She attended the University of Texas at San Antonio.

References

University of Texas alumni
Beauty pageant winners

1995 births

Living people